The 2017 Conwy Council election took place on 4 May 2017 to elect members of Conwy County Borough Council in Wales. It was on the same day as other 2017 Welsh local elections. The previous elections took place on 3 May 2012.

59 Councillors across 38 Wards were elected/returned. Elections took place in 32 of the 38 wards, with the remaining six wards - Bryn, Caerhun, Eglwysbach, Llansannan, Llysfaen and Pandy - seeing their councillors returned without a contest.

Overview

|}

References

2017 Welsh local elections
2017